Paul Lingenbrink Whitman (April 23, 1897–December 12, 1950) was an American artist who played an active role in the art community of the Monterey Peninsula for 24 years. His works are in the art collections of the National Gallery of Art, the Monterey Museum of Art and the Fine Arts Museums of San Francisco. Whitman was one of the original members of the Carmel Art Association. He worked in a variety of media that included etching, charcoal drawing, watercolor, oil, lithography, and sculpture.

Early life

Whitman was born in Denver, Colorado on April 23, 1897. He was the son of Charles Nicholas Whitman (1840-1899) and Pauline W Lingenbrink (1867-1925). His family moved from Denver to St. Louis, Missouri when he was a young boy. After going to a preparatory school in the East, Whitman became a student at Yale University. When World War I broke out, he went into the United States Army from 1918 to 1921. After the war, he continued with studies at Washington University in St. Louis. He married Anita Hedwig Moll on October 18, 1921, and had three children. 

In the late 1920s Whitman and his family moved from Missouri to Carmel-by-the-Sea, California and worked with oils, watercolors, lithographs, landscapes, and waterfront paintings. He enjoyed surf fishing and duck hunting. Carmel builder Walter B. Snook built a Spanish Eclectic home for Whitman on San Luis Avenue in Carmel Woods in 1928.

Career

Whitman was a painter, etcher, illustrator, lithographer, muralist, sculptor and teacher. He was one of the original members of the Carmel Art Association in Carmel and a one time vice-president. He was an art instructor at the Douglas School, in Pebble Beach, now the Stevenson School from 1838 to 1841.

His works are included in the collections of the National Gallery of Art, Mills College Art Museum, the Monterey Museum of Art and the Fine Arts Museums of San Francisco.

In October 1938, Whitman constructed two bas reliefs for the front of the new Bank of Carmel building in Carmel-by-the-Sea at the corner of Ocean Avenue and Delores Street. The two plaques represent Father Serra and figures of a man and woman.

There have been exhibitions of his works at the Derek Rayne Gallery Exhibition (1947), the Beardsley Gallery Exhibition (1947), and the Trotter Galleries (2020). Other Exhibits of his art have been with the Maxwell Galleries, Del Monte Art Gallery, Courvoisier Gallery and the Smithsonian.

Exhibits that are in permanent collections include: Stanford University, The Fine Arts Museums of San Francisco, Monterey Museum of Art and the California State Library.

Death

At the height of his career, age 53, Whitman died in Carmel on December 12, 1950, of a heart attack.

Gallery

References

External links
 

Paul Whitman Official website

1897 births
1950 deaths
20th-century American artists
American male painters
20th-century American male artists
Yale College alumni
Washington University in St. Louis alumni